Macara dyari is a moth of the Megalopygidae family. It was described by Paul Dognin in 1914. It is found in Colombia.

References

Megalopygidae
Moths described in 1914
Taxa named by Paul Dognin